The women's super-G competition of the 2015 Winter Universiade was held at Universiade slope, Sierra Nevada, Spain on February 6, 2015.

Results

Women's super G